Charles Robert Band (born December 27, 1951) is an American film producer and director, known for his work on horror comedy movies.

Career
Band entered film production in the 1970s with Charles Band Productions. Dissatisfied with distributors' handling of his movies, he formed Empire Pictures in 1983. At its height, Empire would release an average of two films a month, one theatrically and one on home video. Movies released by Empire included Ghoulies and Ghoulies II, and the cult classic Re-Animator. 

Empire folded in 1988, due to financial difficulties. Band would found Full Moon Productions the same year. Full Moon releases include the Puppet Master and Subspecies series. Full Moon's family-oriented label Moonbeam Entertainment released the Prehysteria! trilogy.

Personal life
Band was born in Los Angeles, California. He is the son of director-producer Albert Band, and brother of composer Richard. Band's grandfather was the artist Max Band. With his former wife Meda, Band had two children, Alex, the vocalist for the band The Calling, and Taryn. He had two sons with his former wife Debra Dion.

Filmography

As director
 Last Foxtrot in Burbank (1973, as Carlo Bokino)
 Crash! (1977)
 Parasite (1982)
 Metalstorm: The Destruction of Jared-Syn (1983)
 The Alchemist (1983, as James Amante)
 Ragewar (1984, segment "Heavy Metal")
 Trancers (1985)
 Pulse Pounders (1988)
 Meridian: Kiss of the Beast (1990)
 Crash and Burn (1990)
 Trancers II (1991)
 Doctor Mordrid (1992)
 Prehysteria! (1993)
 Dollman vs. Demonic Toys (1993)
 Head of the Family (1996, as Robert Talbot)
 Mystery Monsters (1997, as Robert Talbot)
 Hideous! (1997)
 The Creeps (1997)
 Blood Dolls (1999)
 NoAngels.com (2000)
 Full Moon Fright Night (2002, TV Series)
 Puppet Master: The Legacy (2003)
 Dr. Moreau's House of Pain (2004)
 Decadent Evil Dead (2005)
 Doll Graveyard (2005)
 The Gingerdead Man (2005)
 Petrified (2006)
 Evil Bong (2006)
 The Haunted Casino (2007)
 Decadent Evil Dead II (2007)
 Dangerous Chucky Dolls (2008)
 Evil Bong II: King Bong (2009)
 Skull Heads (2009, Video)
 Evil Bong 3-D: The Wrath of Bong (2011)
 Killer Eye: Halloween Haunt (2011)
 DevilDolls (2012)
 The Dead Want Women (2012)
 Puppet Master X: Axis Rising (2012)
 Ooga Booga (2013)
 Blood of 1000 Virgins (2013, Documentary)
 Nazithon: Decadence and Destruction (2013, Documentary)
 Unlucky Charms (2013)
 Bada$$ Mothaf**kas (2013, Documentary)
 Gingerdead Man vs. Evil Bong (2013)
 The Haunted Dollhouse (2013)
 Trophy Heads (2014)
 Evil Bong 420 (2015)
 Kings of Cult (2015, Documentary)
 Evil Bong: High 5 (2016)
 Ravenwolf Towers: The Feature (2016, Video)
 Ravenwolf Towers (2016, TV Series)
 Fists of Fury (2016)
 Evil Bong 666 (2017)
 Puppet Master: Axis Termination (2017)
 Evil Bong 777 (2018)
 Puppet Master: Blitzkrieg Massacre as Robert Talbot (2018)
 Bunker of Blood: Chapter 2 - Deadly Dolls: Deepest Cuts (2018, Video)
 Death Heads: Brain Drain (2018, Video)
 Vampire Slaughter: Eaten Alive (2018, Video)
 Bunker of Blood: Chapter 6: Zombie Lust: Night Flesh (2018, Video)
 Bunker of Blood: Chapter 8: Butcher's Bake Off: Hell's Kitchen (2018, Video)
 Corona Zombies (2020, Video)
 Barbie & Kendra Save the Tiger King (2020, Video)
 Barbie & Kendra Storm Area 51 (2020)
 Evil Bong 888: Infinity High (2022)

Bibliography
 Confessions of a Puppetmaster: A Hollywood Memoir of Ghouls, Guts, and Gonzo Filmmaking (2021, with Adam Felber)

List of Full Moon films

Charles Band Productions
 Last Foxtrot in Burbank (1973)
 Mansion of the Doomed (1975)
 Cinderella (1977)
 Crash! (1977)
 End of the World (1977)
 Auditions (1978)
 Laserblast (1978)
 Fairy Tales (1979)
 Tourist Trap (1979)
 The Day Time Ended (1980)
 The Best of Sex and Violence (1980)
 Famous T&A (1982)
 Parasite (1982)
 Metalstorm: The Destruction of Jared-Syn (1983)
 Filmgore (1983)
 Walking the Edge (1985)

Empire

The Alchemist (1983)
The Dungeonmaster (1984)
Ghost Warrior (1984)
Trancers (1984)
Ghoulies (1985)
Re-Animator (1985)
Savage Island (1985)
Underworld (1985)
Walking the Edge (1985)
Zone Troopers (1985)
Breeders (1986)
Crawlspace (1986)
Dreamaniac (1986)
Eliminators (1986)
From Beyond (1986)
Necropolis (1986)
Rawhead Rex (1986)
Robot Holocaust (1986)
Troll (1986)
TerrorVision (1986)
Vicious Lips (1986)
The Caller (1987)
Creepozoids (1987)
Dolls (1987)
Enemy Territory (1987)
Mutant Hunt (1987)
The Princess Academy (1987)
Ghoulies II (1987)
Prison (1987)
Valet Girls (1987)
Assault of the Killer Bimbos (1988)
Buy & Cell (1988)
Catacombs (1988)
Cellar Dweller (1988)
Ghost Town (1988)
Pulse Pounders (1988)
Sorority Babes in the Slimeball Bowl-O-Rama (1988)
Transformations (1988)
Arena (1989)
Deadly Weapon (1989)
Intruder (1989)
Robot Jox (1989)
Spellcaster (1991)

Full Moon

Puppet Master

Pulp Fantasy
 Head of the Family (1996)
 The Killer Eye (1998)
 Killer Eye: Halloween Haunt (2011)

Action Xtreme
 Alien Arsenal (1999)
 Murdercycle (1999)

Filmonsters!
 Frankenstein Reborn! (1998)
 The Werewolf Reborn! (1998)

Alchemy Entertainment/Big City Pictures
 Ragdoll (1999)
 The Horrible Dr. Bones (2000)
 Killjoy (2000)
 The Vault (2001)
 Cryptz (2002)
 Killjoy 2: Deliverance from Evil (2002)

References

External links
 
 Charles Band's Blog
 MJ Simpson - Career Interview (2005)
 Killer POV - Career Interview (January 2014) (MP3)
  (Flash)

1951 births
Film producers from California
Film directors from Los Angeles
Horror film directors
Science fiction film directors
Living people
American people of Lithuanian-Jewish descent
Jewish American writers
Writers from Los Angeles
21st-century American Jews